Jean Tarcisius Batamboc (born 1 October 1987) is a Cameroonian sprinter who specializes in the 100 metres.

He competed at the 2011 All-Africa Games, the 2012 African Championships, the 2014 African Championships and the 2015 African Games without progressing from the heats. He then competed at the 2017 World Championships, ending last in the heats.

As a part of the Cameroonian 4 × 100 metres relay team he finished fifth at the 2012 African Championships and sixth at the 2014 African Championships.

References

1987 births
Living people
Cameroonian male sprinters
World Athletics Championships athletes for Cameroon
Athletes (track and field) at the 2019 African Games
Athletes (track and field) at the 2015 African Games
African Games competitors for Cameroon
20th-century Cameroonian people
21st-century Cameroonian people